Crataegus azarolus is a species of hawthorn known by the common names azarole, azerole, and Mediterranean medlar. It is native to the Mediterranean Basin and is a common plant there, growing on sites comparable to those the European common hawthorn grows on. In the Arab countries it is the most common hawthorn species. When growing in the wild, the azerole bears plentiful crops of haw fruits, which are similar to the haws of the European common hawthorn, but more plump.

C. azarolus is often divided into subspecies or varieties, for example Christensen in his monograph uses four varieties: 
C. azarolus var. azarolus has orange fruit.
C. azarolus var. aronia L., has yellowish fruit often with some red tinges
C. azarolus var. chlorocarpa (Moris) K.I.Chr. has yellowish fruit
C. azarolus var. pontica (K.Koch) K.I.Chr. has yellowish or orange fruit

C. azarolus has been used historically for a number of medicinal purposes.

Gallery

References

Further reading

azarolus
Flora of Western Asia
Flora of the Mediterranean Basin
Trees of Mediterranean climate
Garden plants of Europe
Bird food plants
Ornamental trees
Plants described in 1753
Taxa named by Carl Linnaeus